Marjory is a female given name, a variant spelling of Marjorie, Margaery or Margery. It is sometimes shortened to Marj.

Notable people with the name include:

Marjory Allen, Lady Allen of Hurtwood (1897–1976)
Marjery Bryce (1891–1973), British suffragette and actor
Marjory Cobbe, English midwife granted a pension in 1469 for attending the wife of Edward IV
Marjory Gengler, American tennis player
Marjory Gordon, emeritus professor of nursing at Boston College, Chestnut Hill, Massachusetts
Marjory Kennedy-Fraser (1857–1930), Scottish singer, composer and arranger
Marjory LeBreton (born 1940), Leader of the Government in the Canadian Senate
Marjory Mecklenburg (born 1935), American government administrator and activist opposed to legal abortion
Marjory Mills (1896–1987), New Zealand embroiderer and businesswoman
Marjory Newbold (1883–1926), Scottish socialist and communist
Marjory Saunders (1913–2010), Canadian archer
Marjory Shedd (1926–2008), Canadian badminton player
Marjory Stephenson (1885–1948), British biochemist
Marjory Stoneman Douglas (1890–1998), American journalist, writer, feminist and environmentalist
Marjory Wardrop (1869–1909), English scholar and translator of Georgian literature

See also
Marjory Razorblade, 1973 double-LP by British musician Kevin Coyne

Feminine given names

ru:Марджори